English Qabalah (alternatively English Cabala(h)) refers to several different systems of mysticism related to Hermetic Qabalah that interpret the letters of the Roman script or English alphabet via an assigned set of numerological significances. The spelling "English Qaballa," on the other hand, refers specifically to a Qabalah supported by a system of arithmancy discovered by James Lees in 1976.

While some writers make a distinction between a qabalah and a gematria, in current usage the term qabalah may refer to either type of system. Most of the systems developed since the death of Aleister Crowley (1875-1947) have been created with the intent of gaining a better understanding of the mysteries elaborated in his inspired works, especially those in Liber AL vel Legis, the Book of the Law.

Qabalah vs. gematria
According to Jake Stratton-Kent, a qabalah is specifically related to three factors: a language, a holy text or texts, and mathematical laws at work in these two.

Gematria, on the other hand, is a system in which letters are equated to number values. The letters comprising the word or name of person or object are then summed together. The number of this sum is termed the key of that particular word. Words sharing the same key are said to share properties. The letters are often tabulated along with their numerical equivalents.

An example of the simplest serial gematria for English letters would be the following:

 A=1  B=2  C=3  D=4  E=5  F=6  G=7  H=8  I=9  J=10  K=11  L=12  M=13 
 N=14 O=15 P=16 Q=17 R=18 S=19 T=20 U=21 V=22 W=23  X=24  Y=25  Z=26

Systems of English qabalah

Willis F. Whitehead
The first reference to an English Qabalah found in the literature was made by Willis F. Whitehead in 1899 in his book, The Mystic Thesaurus, in which he describes a system he called "English Cabala."

Aleister Crowley
In 1904, Aleister Crowley wrote out the text of the foundational document of his world-view, known as Liber AL vel Legis, The Book of the Law. In this text was the injunction found at verse 2:55; "Thou shalt obtain the order & value of the English Alphabet, thou shalt find new symbols to attribute them unto" which was understood by Crowley as referring to an English Qabalah yet to be developed or revealed. In one of the Holy Books of Thelema written by Aleister Crowley in 1907, called Liber Trigrammaton, sub figura XXVII -- Being the Book of the Mutations of the Tao with the Yin and the Yang, are 27 three-line diagrams known as 'trigrams', which are composed of a solid line for the Yang, a broken line for the Yin, and a point for the Tao. By attributing 26 Roman script letters to the trigrams of this work, Crowley felt that he had fulfilled the injunction to "obtain the order & value of the English Alphabet", as noted in his 'Old Comment' to The Book of the Law. Crowley did not go on to develop a full qabalah from this work.

James Lees' English Qaballa (EQ)

The first report of the system known as English Qaballa (EQ) was published in 1979 by Ray Sherwin in an editorial in the final issue of his journal, The New Equinox. In his editorial, Sherwin reported that the "order & value of the English Alphabet" had been discovered by an English magician, James Lees, in November 1976. Lees subsequently assumed the role of publisher of The New Equinox and, starting in 1981, published additional material about the EQ system over the course of five issues of the journal, extending into 1982. The first software designed to perform textual analysis of Liber AL and the other Holy Books of Thelema was written in 1984-5 by Trevor Langford. Langford subsequently worked with Jake Stratton-Kent on The Equinox: British Journal of Thelema, in which further original material on EQ was summarized by Stratton-Kent in the March 1988 issue.

More recently, the system is described in Jake Stratton-Kent's 2011 book, The Serpent Tongue: Liber 187. This was followed in 2016 by The Magickal Language of the Book of the Law: An English Qaballa Primer by Cath Thompson. The discovery, exploration, and continuing research and development of the system up to 2010, by James Lees and members of his group in England, are detailed in her 2018 book, All This and a Book.

Linda Falorio's Liber CXV: The English Qabalah
Kenneth Grant, in his 1992 book Hecate's Fountain, discusses Linda Falorio's at the time unpublished work, Liber CXV: The English Qabalah, stating that it was written in Pittsburgh in 1979.<ref>{{cite book |last=Grant |first=Kenneth |title=Hecate's Fountain |series=Typhonian Trilogies |volume=6 |publisher=Skoob Books |location=London |year=1992 |pages=86, 190, 268}}</ref> Falorio has since published Liber CXV on her website, EnglishQabalah.com. Her site appears to claim unregistered trademarks on "The English Qabalah", "EQ", and "E.Q."

William Eisen's The English Cabalah
A system related to the Spiritualist Agasha Temple of Wisdom was described by William Eisen in his two volume The English Cabalah (1980–82).

William Gray's Concepts of Qabalah
William G. Gray proposes another system in his 1984 book, Concepts of Qabalah, more recently republished as Qabalistic Concepts. This system includes correspondence attributions of the English letters to the positions on the Tree of Life.

R. Leo Gillis' Trigrammaton Qabalah (TQ)
Another system of English Qabalah was proposed by R. Leo Gillis around 1988, and published on his website, Trigrammaton.com, starting in 1998, and subsequently released as an eBook. Known as Trigrammaton Qabalah, or TQ, this system is based on one of the Holy Books of Thelema written by Aleister Crowley in 1907, called Liber Trigrammaton, sub figura XXVII -- Being the Book of the Mutations of the Tao with the Yin and the Yang. Liber Trigrammaton (aka Liber XXVII) was called by Crowley "the ultimate foundation of the highest theoretical qabalah". 

In Liber XXVII are 27 three-line diagrams known as 'trigrams', which are composed of a solid line representing yang, a broken line representing the yin, and a point representing Tao. Crowley later attributed the 26 letters of the English alphabet to these trigrams, in an attempt to fulfill an injunction found in his earlier work Liber AL vel Legis, The Book of the Law, verse 2:55 which states: "Thou shalt obtain the order & value of the English Alphabet, thou shalt find new symbols to attribute them unto." By attributing the English alphabet to the trigrams in his later work, Crowley considered this verse to be fulfilled, as noted in his 'Old Comment' to The Book of the Law.

TQ is an extension of Crowley's work with Liber Trigrammaton. By considering the numerical value of the 27 trigrams as expressions in ternary (base 3), and then transferring those values to the letters attributed by Crowley to the trigrams, a system of English gematria is created. Further use is made of the trigrams to create a true qabalah in the sense of the definition provided by Jake Stratton-Kent above. Correspondences are created with some of the major forms of divination such as the I Ching, Tarot and runes, as well as Greek and Hebrew alphabets, the Tree of Life, Western and Vedic astrology, magic squares, and the Platonic solids. A primary feature of this qabalah is a new understanding of the Cube of Space and its 26 components of edges, faces, and vertices, which equal the number of letters in the English alphabet.

Trigrammaton Qabalah gematria values are as follows:

 A=5  B=20  C=2  D=23  E=13  F=12  G=11  H=3  I=0  J=7 K=17 L=1  M=21
 N=24 O=10  P=4  Q=16  R=14  S=15  T=9   U=25 V=22 W=8 X=6  Y=18 Z=19

E. Joel Love's Cipher X
In 1994, E. Joel Love, a student of the ALW cipher (who was both a colleague of Greenfield and Coutu), and a member of the Hermetic Alchemical Order of the QBLH, proposed another English cipher that he would call 'Cipher X'. Love possessed a high mathematical aptitude and formal training in cryptography in the U.S Coast Guard. A lifelong Thelemite, Love considered the ALW cipher to be incomplete to the task of answering many of the cosmological and deep structure questions proposed by Gillis' system. Both Gillis and Stratton-Kent met with Joel Love in 2004 and were mutually surprised to find that both Love's and Gillis' work contained many striking parallels.

Love considered the ALW cipher to be representative of an authentic epistle, and interpreted verses in Liber XXVII to hint at a process of inversion. By taking the obvious base three trigrams system of Liber XXVII, and by comparing them to the cipher key of ALW, these inversions resulted in 'Cipher X' which, technically speaking, is the base three inversion of the ALW Cipher. Love always maintained that Cipher X was a complement to ALW, and himself being an advanced user of LEXICON, was a vocal proponent of comparing the results of many ciphers, a study he called 'cross cipher correlation'.

Love would go on to compile over 20 years of notes and research. Love had several students, the first of which was longtime friend and colleague H. Thomas Chaudoin. Chaudoin maintains that he was present during the years that the bulk of this research was 'transmitted' to Love. Chaudoin would go on to found the NOT (New Order of Thelema), using many of Love's innovations as a foundation. Love died in June 2015.

Base 3 inversion of the ALW cipher values results in the following values:
 A=9  B=20 C=13 D=6  E=17 F=2  G=19 H=12 I=23 J=16 K=1  L=18 M=5 
 N=22 O=15 P=26 Q=11 R=4  S=21 T=8  U=25 V=10 W=3  X=14 Y=7  Z=24

Frater Perseverando's Liber A vel Follis and the English Cabala - 111

On January 23, 1995, Frater Perseverando, also known as Nox Cipher, wrote Liber A vel Follis: The Book of the Holy Fool, which he describes as having been from Auset. He refers to the system in this short document as either "The English Cabala - 111" or "the 1=A=0 cipher", shorthand for expressing both the order and the value of the letters of the alphabet; that is, A is number 1, and has the value of 0 - extended serially to number 26 - Z, having a value of 25. The letters X and Y are switched in his order, but not their values, to accommodate a section of the puzzle of AL II:76 as well as reflect the symbolic elemental shapes of the letters.

In this system, the letters of the phrase "the English cabala" sums to 111, as does "order & value"; and in accordance with Liber Legis I:24 ("I am Nuit and my word is six and fifty"), the letters of "word" add to 56. The letters of the English alphabet A through V are then assigned to the Tarot Major Arcana in order as paths 11 through 32, and W, Y, X and Z to the four Tarot Aces and four additional paths, 33 through 36, with all of the associated classic Western Esoteric Qabalah attributes of elements, planets, signs, magical weapons.

Frater Perseverando points out that in this system, the letters of the name "Hadit" sums to 37, which is also the Hebrew gematria value of Yechidah ('unity'). Also the letters of the phrase "Paste the sheets from right to left" from AL III:73 add to 333. He demonstrates how these two correspondences align with the Hebrew Qabalah of the Nine Chambers or AIQ BKR, and its gematria value of 333, with each column or chamber of three "rooms" adding to one of the nine triple numbers which share the root 37: 111 through 999 (i.e. 1+1+1=3, 3x37=111; 2+2+2=6, 6x37=222; and so on). The first two of the Nine Chambers with three "rooms" are: 1 - AIQ - Aleph/1, Yod/10, Qoph/100 = 111; 2 - BKR - Beth/2, Kaph/20, Resh/200 = 222; thus AIQ/111 plus BKR/222 = 333. One can extrapolate the other seven chambers from there. In this way, the 27th "room", Tzaddi final, becomes a final 37th path, the significant number of Hadit. This is assigned to the Rose Cross tarotee' on the back of Crowley's Thoth Tarot deck, symbolized by a cross in a circle as a new 27th letter, an allusion to AL I:57 "[Tzaddi] is not the Star" and AL III:47 "this circle squared ⊕".

Perseverando also added four additional petals to the traditional Rose Cross to accommodate the English alphabet in what he calls "the English rose" with the three central letters being AUM, and posits that in so doing, the "order & value of the English Alphabet" of AL II:55 provides a true working cabala and magical alphabet.

David Cherubim's English Qabalah: The Key of it All
In 1996, David Cherubim published English Qabalah: The Key of it All under the auspices of The Order of the Thelemic Golden Dawn.

Systems of English gematria

The first appearance of a system of gematria using the natural order of the English alphabet was developed in 1532 by Michael Stifel, who also proposed a system called the trigonal alphabet, using successive triangular numbers. Another early system of English gematria was used by poet John Skelton. An analogue of the Greek system of isopsephy using the Latin alphabet appeared in 1583. Other variations appeared in 1683 (simply referred to as the 1683 alphabet, this system was used by Leo Tolstoy in War and Peace to identify Napoleon with the number of the Beast) and 1707 (Alphabetum Cabbalisticum Vulgare). These and other variations are detailed in Underwood Dudley's Numerology, Or, What Pythagoras Wrought.

In 1952, John P.L. Hughes published The Hidden Numerical Significance of the English Language, or, Suggestive Gematria, based on his lecture delivered at Holden Research Circle on July 4, 1952. More recently, Michael Bertiaux described a system called Angelic Gematria in his The Voudon Gnostic Workbook (1989), and David Rankine described a system of English gematria using prime numbers which he calls Prime Qabalah in his book Becoming Magick'' (2004).

References

Citations

Works cited

Further reading

External links
"History of Ciphers" (part 1) - The Ciphers of the Illuminati - first of article of a series
 - lists several sites related to English Qabalah

Ceremonial magic
Hermetic Qabalah